Euphractinae is an armadillo subfamily in the family Chlamyphoridae. 

Euphractinae are known for having a well developed osteoderm that has large cavities filled with adipose tissue, and more hair follicles with well developed sebaceous glands in comparison to the Dasypodidae sub family. These are believed to be evolutionary adaptations in the Euphractinae to support it in the cooler climate that it usually lives in.



Taxonomy 
It contains the following genera:
Chaetophractus, hairy armadillos
Euphractus, six-banded armadillos
Zaedyus, pichis

Extinct genera include:
 Paleuphractus
 Doellotatus
 Proeuphractus
 Macroeuphractus

Phylogeny
A mitochondrial DNA investigation has concluded that Euphractinae is the sister group of a clade consisting of Chlamyphorinae (fairy armadillos) and Tolypeutinae (giant, three-banded and naked-tailed armadillos) along with extinct glyptodonts, as shown below.

References 

Armadillos
Mammal subfamilies
Eocene xenarthrans
Oligocene xenarthrans
Miocene xenarthrans
Pliocene xenarthrans
Pleistocene xenarthrans
Extant Eocene first appearances
Taxa named by Herluf Winge